Rutherfordton-Spindale Middle School is a historic school building located in Rutherfordton, Rutherford County, North Carolina. It was designed by architect Hugh Edward White (1869-1939) and built in 1924–1925. It is a three-story, "L"-plan, Classical Revival style red brick building.  The classroom wing was rebuilt following a fire in 1938. A separate Vocational Education Building was added to the school in 1939.  It sits on landscaped grounds designed by Earle Sumner Draper (1893–1994).

It was added to the National Register of Historic Places in 1993 as the Rutherfordton-Spindale Central High School.

References

High schools in North Carolina
School buildings on the National Register of Historic Places in North Carolina
Neoclassical architecture in North Carolina
School buildings completed in 1925
Buildings and structures in Rutherford County, North Carolina
National Register of Historic Places in Rutherford County, North Carolina
Rutherfordton, North Carolina
1925 establishments in North Carolina